There have been five baronetcies created for persons with the surname Ward, one in the Baronetage of England, one in the Baronetage of Ireland and three in the Baronetage of the United Kingdom. See also Warde baronets.

The Ward Baronetcy, of Bixley in the County of Norfolk, was created in the Baronetage of England on 19 December 1660 for Edward Ward, Sheriff of Norfolk. The title became extinct on the death of the eighth Baronet in circa 1770.

The Ward Baronetcy, of Killagh in the County of Down, was created in the Baronetage of Ireland on 9 December 1682 for Robert Ward. The title became extinct on his death in 1691.

The Ward Baronetcy, of Wellington in New Zealand, was created in the Baronetage of the United Kingdom on 20 June 1911 for Joseph Ward, Prime Minister of New Zealand from 1906 to 1912 and 1928 to 1930. His younger son Vincent Ward was also a politician.

The Ward Baronetcy, of Wilbraham Place in Chelsea, was created in the Baronetage of the United Kingdom on 20 January 1914 for the soldier Edward Ward. The title became extinct on the death of the third Baronet in 1873.

The Ward Baronetcy, of Blyth in the County of Northumberland, was created in the Baronetage of the United Kingdom on 29 June 1929 for the Conservative politician Lambert Ward. The title became extinct on his death in 1956.

Ward baronets, of Bixley (1660)

Sir Edward Ward, 1st Baronet (–1684)
Sir Edward Ward, 2nd Baronet (c. 1641–1686)
Sir Thomas Ward, 3rd Baronet (died 1692)
Sir Edward Ward, 4th Baronet (died 1719)
Sir Edward Ward, 5th Baronet (died 1737)
Sir Edward Ward, 6th Baronet (1721–1742)
Sir Randall Ward, 7th Baronet (died 1762)
Sir Edward Ward, 8th Baronet (died c. 1770)

Ward baronets, of Killagh (1682)
Sir Robert Ward, 1st Baronet (c. 1610–1691)

Ward baronets, of Wellington (1911)

Sir Joseph George Ward, 1st Baronet (1856–1930)
Sir Cyril Rupert Joseph Ward, 2nd Baronet (1884–1940)
Sir Joseph George Davidson Ward, 3rd Baronet (1909–1970)
Sir Joseph James Laffey Ward, 4th Baronet (1946–2021)
Sir Joseph James Martin Ward, 5th Baronet (born 1971)

The presumed heir apparent is the Baronet's uncle Roderic Anthony Ward (born 1948).

Arms of the baronets of Wellington
Escutcheon: Azure a cross moline Argent between four keys wards upwards Or.
Crest: A demi-griffin Azure in front of two keys in saltire wards upwards Or.
Motto: Animo Et Fide

Ward baronets, of Wilbraham Place (1914)
Sir Edward Willis Duncan Ward, 1st Baronet (1853–1928)
Sir Edward Simons Ward, 2nd Baronet (1882–1930)
Sir Melvill Willis Ward, 3rd Baronet (1885–1973)

Ward baronets, of Blyth (1929)
Sir (Albert) Lambert Ward, 1st Baronet (1875–1956)

References

Kidd, Charles, Williamson, David (editors). Debrett's Peerage and Baronetage (1990 edition). New York: St Martin's Press, 1990.

Baronetcies in the Baronetage of the United Kingdom
Extinct baronetcies in the Baronetage of England
Extinct baronetcies in the Baronetage of Ireland
Extinct baronetcies in the Baronetage of the United Kingdom